Brassia verrucosa, also known as warty brassia, is a species of plant in the family Orchidaceae native to Mexico, Central America (Costa Rica, El Salvador, Guatemala, Honduras, Nicaragua), Venezuela, and Brazil.

References

External links

IOSPE orchid photos, Brassia verrucosa
Santa Barbara Orchid Estate, Brassia verrucosa
Association Amboise d'Orchidophilie Exotique, Brassia verrucosa
Colobri Orquídeas, Brassia verrucosa
Orquídeas Soltas, Brassia verrucosa

verrucosa
Orchids of Central America
Orchids of Mexico
Orchids of Venezuela
Orchids of Brazil